Rosa anemoniflora is a species of rose found in France.

See also 

 List of Rosa species

References 

anemoniflora
Flora of France